Charles Des Moulins, full name Charles Robert Alexandre Des Moulins (13 March 1798 – 23 December 1875) was a French naturalist, a botanist and malacologist.

He was a member of several learned societies, including the American Philosophical Society, which elected him an international Member in 1861, and the Société linnéenne de Bordeaux, of which he served as its president in 1826.

Taxa
Moulins named and described numerous species of snails, for example:
 Pagodulina pagodula (Des Moulins, 1830)

In turn, in recognition of his services to malacology, a number of species of mollusks were named after him. These latter species included both fossil and recent, both bivalves and gastropods and were mainly non-marine species, however, a few were marine species. Examples as follows:
 Pisania desmoulinsi Montrouzier, 1864 , a marine gastropod
 Anodonta desmoulinsiana Locard, 1882 , a freshwater bivalve
 Nerita desmoulinsiana Dautzenberg & Bouge, 1933, a marine gastropod
 Vertigo moulinsiana Dupuy, 1849, a terrestrial gastropod

Moulins also named various species of plants, including:
 Euphorbia milii Des Moulins, 1826 
The botanical genus Moulinsia (family Sapindaceae) was named in his honor by Jacques Cambessèdes.

Bibliography 
 1831: Etudes s. l. Echinides 
 1840: Catalogue raisonné des plantes qui croissent spontanément dans le département de la Dordogne. distribuées d'après le synopsis florae Germanicae et Helveticae du docteur G.D.J. Koch. Bordeaux : Th. Lafargue.
 1859: Comparaison des départements de la Gironde et de la Dordogne sous le rapport de leur végétation spontanée et de leurs cultures.
 1869: Quelques réflexions sur la doctrine scientifique dite Darwinisme.

References 

1798 births
1875 deaths
19th-century French botanists
French malacologists